Parky may refer to:

Frank Parkinson (baseball) (1895–1960), American professional baseball player
Harry "Parkyakarkus" Einstein (1904–1958), American dialect comedy actor
Michael Parkinson (born 1935), English broadcaster and author
Andrew Parkinson (basketball) (born 1967), Australian professional basketball player
Gary Parkinson (born 1968), English professional footballer